The Assignment and Sub-letting of Land (Ireland) Act 1826, also known as the Landlord and Tenant (Ireland) Act 1826, was an Act of Parliament enacted during that year of the reign of George IV.

It was substantially amended by the Landlord and Tenant Law Amendment (Ireland) Act 1860.

References

United Kingdom Acts of Parliament 1826
Acts of the Parliament of the United Kingdom concerning Ireland